The Anson Archipelago was a designation for a widely scattered group of purported islands in the Western North Pacific Ocean between Japan and Hawaii. The group was supposed to include Wake Island and Marcus Island, as well as many phantom islands such as Los Jardines, Ganges Island, Rica de Oro, and Rica de Plata (the latter two sometimes referred to as Roca de Oro and Roca de Plata).  The archipelago was named after George Anson, who seized Spanish navigational charts of these waters during his voyage around the world.

See also
 Pedro de Unamuno
 Chryse and Argyre

References

Phantom islands
Islands of the Pacific Ocean
Archipelagoes of the Pacific Ocean
Fictional archipelagoes